Mohawk Ambulance Service is the largest privately owned ambulance service in upstate New York. The service operates Schenectady Ambulance Service, Capital District Ambulance Service, and Doctor's Ambulance Service.

Company history

Mohawk Ambulance & Oxygen Service, Inc. was founded on July 22, 1965, by then-police officer Edward J. O'Connor.  It was dissolved by proclamation and annulment of authority by the New York State Department of State on March 31, 1982.

Parkland Ambulance Service, Inc., a company which is unrelated to Mohawk Ambulance & Oxygen Service, Inc., was incorporated in the State of New York on March 2, 1978. Parkland Ambulance Service, Inc. operates its ambulance service under the authority of the New York State Department of Health under the name Mohawk Ambulance Service. Mohawk Ambulance Service began providing paramedic level service in 1982, one of the first ambulance services in the area to do so. In 1984,  Schenectady Ambulance Service was purchased by the owners of Parkland Ambulance Service, Inc., and is now operated alongside (but independently) and staffed by Mohawk Ambulance Service. In 1985, Mohawk Ambulance Service opened a station in the city of Troy, New York, and followed with a third station in Albany, New York, in 1986. In 1989, Mohawk Ambulance Service began to operate a specialty neonate/pediatric transport unit in conjunction with Albany Medical Center. In 2002, Mohawk Ambulance Service opened a fourth station in the town of Brunswick, New York, and began to provide primary 911 response to the town and surrounding municipalities. Station 5, the second in the city of Albany, was opened in 2008. In 2012, a sixth station was opened in the town of Glenville, New York.

In 2017, Parkland Ambulance Service, Inc. acquired the assets of Capital District Ambulance Service, Inc. and Physician's Ambulance Service, Inc. d/b/a Doctor's Ambulance Service. and began additional operations under the names Capital District Ambulance Service and Doctors Ambulance Service.

References

External links
Official site

Companies based in Schenectady County, New York
Ambulance services in the United States
Emergency services in New York (state)
American companies established in 1964
1964 establishments in New York (state)
Medical and health organizations based in New York (state)